Chen Fuhai (born 9 February 1997) is a Chinese footballer who plays for Guangzhou R&F.

Club career
Chen Fuhai was promoted to Chinese Super League side Guangzhou R&F first team squad by manager Dragan Stojković in July 2016. In August 2017, he was loaned to Hong Kong Premier League side R&F (Hong Kong), which was the satellite team of Guangzhou R&F. On 9 September 2017, he made his professional senior debut in a 3–2 away loss to Hong Kong Pegasus. He scored his first senior goal on 5 November 2017 in a 2–1 home win over Dreams FC.

Career statistics 
.

References

External links
 

1995 births
Living people
Association football midfielders
Chinese footballers
Footballers from Guangzhou
Guangzhou City F.C. players
R&F (Hong Kong) players
Chinese Super League players
Hong Kong Premier League players